Bontebok is a village in Heerenveen in the province of Friesland, the Netherlands. It had a population of around 400 in 2017.

The village was first mentioned in 1640 as Bonte Bock, and is named after an inn which used a goat as a sign board. Bontebok developed during the peat excavation of the area. The inn was located near a sluice where boatmen had to wait. The inn was later joined by a couple of shops and pubs, and a hamlet developed. In 1840, Bontebok was home to 46 people. In 1898, a dairy factory opened in Bontebok.

Gallery

References

External links

Populated places in Friesland
Heerenveen